Radio-Active-Music was an independent record label founded in 2004 and based in Washington DC.  Radio-Active-Music releases and distributes bands in the goth and industrial genres.  It ceased operations in 2012.

Overview 
Radio-Active-Music was a home to approximately two dozen artists, including Hopeful Machines (a side-project of Ego Likeness), XUBERX, 23RAINYDAYS, Gravity Euphonic, Third Realm, and Heretics in the Lab.  Radio-Active-Music was distributed by Super D One Stop, and COP International.

External links 
 Radio-Active-Music Official Site

References 

American record labels